John Neil "Pinky" Patterson (July 27, 1885 – December 20, 1948) was an American track and field athlete who competed in the 1908 Summer Olympics.

He was born in Detroit and died in Los Angeles.

In 1908 he finished seventh in the high jump competition.

References
sports-reference.com

1885 births
1948 deaths
American male high jumpers
Olympic track and field athletes of the United States
Athletes (track and field) at the 1908 Summer Olympics
Olympic male high jumpers
Track and field athletes from Michigan